Jaw's Blues is a live album by American jazz saxophonist Eddie "Lockjaw" Davis recorded in Munich in 1981 and released on the German Enja label.

Critical reception 

Allmusic stated "The tough-toned and always-passionate tenor saxophonist Eddie "Lockjaw" Davis is in typically combative form on this quartet date ... Fans of the tenor will want this swinging set".

Track listing 
 "I'll Remember April" (Gene de  Paul, Patricia Johnston, Don Raye) – 6:24
 "Young Man With a Horn" (George Stoll, Ralph Freed) – 4:18
 "What Is This Thing Called Love?" (Cole Porter) – 7:01
 "Broadway" (Billy Bird, Teddy McRae, Henri Woode) – 7:28
 "But Beautiful" (Jimmy Van Heusen, Johnny Burke) – 4:41
 "Jaw's Blues" (Eddie "Lockjaw" Davis) – 7:31
 "On Green Dolphin Street" (Bronisław Kaper, Ned Washington) – 7:30 Bonus track on CD reissue
 "Days of Wine and Roses" (Henry Mancini, Johnny Mercer) – 7:14 Bonus track on CD reissue

Personnel 
 Eddie "Lockjaw" Davis – tenor saxophone
 Horace Parlan – piano
 Reggie Johnson – bass
 Alvin Queen – drums

References 

Eddie "Lockjaw" Davis live albums
1981 live albums
Enja Records live albums